Benjamin Cameron Grant (July 14, 1908 – July 30, 1991) was a Canadian professional ice hockey goalie who played 53 games in the National Hockey League for the New York Americans, Toronto Maple Leafs, and Boston Bruins between 1928 and 1944. The rest of his career was spent in various minor leagues. Benny Grant was a junior star with the hometown Owen Sound Greys of the OHA, with whom he won the 1927 Memorial Cup.

Grant found his niche in the newly created American Hockey League in 1936-37 where he starred for the Springfield Indians. In 1940-41 he moved on to the St. Paul Saints of the AHA and was named to the league's first all-star team after posting a 1.94 goals against average the next year. After sitting out the 1942-43 season he returned to play 20 games for the Maple Leafs who were dealing with the loss of Turk Broda to military service. Benny was in net for five games with the 1931-1932 Stanley Cup winning Toronto Maple Leafs.

Career statistics

Regular season and playoffs

External links
 

1908 births
1991 deaths
Boston Bruins players
Boston Cubs players
Boston Tigers (CAHL) players
Canadian ice hockey goaltenders
Ice hockey people from Ontario
London Panthers players
Minneapolis Millers (AHA) players
New Haven Eagles players
New York Americans players
Owen Sound Greys players
Philadelphia Arrows players
St. Paul Saints (AHA) players
Springfield Indians players
Sportspeople from Owen Sound
Syracuse Stars (IHL) players
Toronto Maple Leafs players